The 1986 Individual Speedway World Championship was the 41st edition of the official World Championship to determine the world champion rider.

Hans Nielsen finally won his first world title after finishing in second place during the two previous Championships. He lost his first ride to arch rival and defending champion Erik Gundersen but then won his next four rides to be crowned the champion. Fellow Dane Jan O. Pedersen took silver and England's Kelvin Tatum took the bronze while Gundersen faded into tenth place.

It was the fourth final to be held at the Silesian Stadium in Poland.

British Qualification

British Final
 June 1, 1986
  Coventry, Brandon Stadium
 Top 9 to Commonwealth Final plus 1 reserve

Swedish Qualification

Swedish Final
 May 21, 22 & 23
  Eskilstuna, Nassjo & Kumla
 First 4 to Nordic Final plus 1 reserve
 Jan Andersson seeded to Nordic Final

Australian Qualification

Australian Final
 January 11, 1986
  Ayr, Pioneer Park Speedway
 Top 4 to Commonwealth Final plus 1 reserve

Intercontinental Round

New Zealand Final
 January 25, 1986
  Gisborne, Gisborne Speedway
 Top 3 to Commonwealth Final

Danish Final
 May 8, 1986
  Fjelsted, Hele Fyns Speedway Center
 Top 5 to Nordic Final plus 1 reserve
 Tommy Knudsen seeded to Nordic Final

Commonwealth Final
 June 8, 1986
  Manchester, Belle Vue Stadium
 Top 11 to the Overseas Final plus 1 reserve

American Final
 June 21, 1986
  Long Beach, Veterans Memorial Stadium
 Top 5 to the Overseas Final

Overseas Final
 June 19, 1986
  Coventry, Brandon Stadium
 Top 9 to Intercontinental Final plus 1 reserve

Nordic Final
 July 4, 1986
  Kumla, Kumla Speedway
 Top 7 to Intercontinental Final plus 1 reserve

Intercontinental Final
 July 20, 1986
  Bradford, Odsal Stadium
 Top 11 to World Final plus 1 reserve

Continental Round

Continental Final
 July 20, 1986
  Wiener Neustadt, ÖAMTC Zweigverein
 Top 4 to World Final plus 1 reserve
 Ryszard Dołomisiewicz (Poland) seeded to World Final

World Final
August 30, 1986
 Chorzów, Silesian Stadium

References

1986
Individual Speedway World
World
Speedway competitions in Poland